Vadzim Boyka (born 3 December 1978) is a retired Belarusian professional footballer.

Honours
Shakhtyor Soligorsk
Belarusian Cup winner: 2003–04

External links
Profile at teams.by

1978 births
Living people
Belarusian footballers
Association football forwards
FC Shakhtyor Soligorsk players
FC Torpedo-BelAZ Zhodino players
FC Dynamo Brest players
FC Bereza-2010 players
FC Granit Mikashevichi players